Lauzon may refer to:

Places 
 the former , in colonial French New France
 Lauzon, Quebec, a Canadian former city, merged into Lévis 
 three southeastern French rivers in the Rhône basin:
 a direct left-bank tributary of the Rhône 
 a tributary of the Durance, itself a tributary of the Rhône
 a tributary of the Ouvèze, itself a tributary of the Rhône
 Montségur-sur-Lauzon, in France
 Saint-Étienne-de-Lauzon, in Canada
 Lauzon Parkway

People 
 Craig Lauzon (born 1971), Canadian comedian
 Dan Lauzon (born 1988), American mixed martial artist
 Gilles Lauzon (1631–1687), French coppersmith and a member of “le grande recrue”, a group of roughly 100 Frenchman recruited to populate the colony of New France
 Guy Lauzon (born 1944), Canadian politician
 Jack M. Lauzon (born 1961), Canadian Thoroughbred horse racing jockey
 Jani Lauzon, Canadian puppeteer and singer
 Jean de Lauzon (1584-1666), Governor of New France
 Jean-Baptiste Lauzon (1858–1944), Canadian politician
 Jean-Claude Lauzon (1953–1997), Canadian filmmaker
 Jérémy Lauzon (1997-), Canadian hockey player 
 Joe Lauzon (born 1984), American mixed martial artist
 Parker Lauzon (born 1978), writer and rhythm guitarist for Evans Blue
 Patrice Lauzon (born 1975), Canadian ice dancer

See also
 Lawson (disambiguation)
 Lozon (disambiguation)